A Way Through the Wood is a 1951 novel by the British writer Nigel Balchin. A car accident exposes a family's deep-buried secret.

In 1954 it was adapted by Ronald Millar into a stage play, Waiting for Gillian, which ran in the West End for 101 performances. In 2005 it was turned into a film, Separate Lies, directed by Julian Fellowes.

References

Bibliography
 Goble, Alan. The Complete Index to Literary Sources in Film. Walter de Gruyter, 1999.

1951 British novels
Novels by Nigel Balchin
British novels adapted into plays
British novels adapted into films
William Collins, Sons books